The Play-offs of the 2009 Fed Cup Europe/Africa Zone Group II were the final stages of the Group II Zonal Competition involving teams from Europe and Africa. Those that placed first and second in their respective pools competed for promotion, while those that placed third were automatically relegated down to Group III.

Promotion play-offs
The first placed teams of each pool were placed against the second placed teams of the other pools. The winner of the rounds advanced to the Group I for next year.

Latvia vs. Georgia

Portugal vs. South Africa

Final Placements

  and  advanced to the Europe/Africa Zone Group I for the next year. Both teams placed last in their respective pools, meaning that they both competed in the relegation play-offs. However, the Latvians won their tie while the Portuguese lost, meaning the latter team was relegated back to Group II for 2011.
Both teams placed first in their respective pools, and ended up winning their promotional play-off ties, meaning they advanced back to Group II for 2011.

See also
Fed Cup structure

References

External links
 Fed Cup website

2009 Fed Cup Europe/Africa Zone